Pournaria is a village and a community in the municipal unit of Kleitor, Arcadia, Greece. In 2001, it had a population of 142 for the village, and 241 for the community, which includes the village Mouria. Pournaria is situated on a hillside, at 500 m elevation. Mouria is 3 km to the southwest of Pournaria, on the northern shore of the Ladon reservoir. Pournaria is 9 km northeast of Tropaia, 10 km southeast of Paos and 42 km northwest of Tripoli.

See also

List of settlements in Arcadia

External links
Pournaria at the GTP Travel Pages

References

Populated places in Arcadia, Peloponnese